Personella is a genus of predatory sea snail, a marine gastropod mollusk in the family Cymatiidae. Its only species is Personella lewisi.

Distribution
This marine species occurs off Guadeloupe.

Description 
The maximum recorded shell length is 27.9 mm.

Habitat 
Minimum recorded depth is 80 m. Maximum recorded depth is 140 m.

References

External links
 Strong E.E., Puillandre N., Beu A.G., Castelin M. & Bouchet P. (2019). Frogs and tuns and tritons – A molecular phylogeny and revised family classification of the predatory gastropod superfamily Tonnoidea (Caenogastropoda). Molecular Phylogenetics and Evolution. 130: 18-34

Cymatiidae
Gastropods described in 1980
Monotypic gastropod genera